Milano calibro 9 is a 1969 short story collection by the Italian writer Giorgio Scerbanenco. It contains 22 stories concerned with the underworld of Milan. The book has been translated to French and Spanish.

Contents

 Milan by Calibro 9
 Basta col cianuro
 Preludio per un massacro estivo
 In pineta si uccide meglio
 Spara che ti passa
 Stazione centrale ammazzare subito
 Minorenne da bruciare
 Conoscerei scopo matrimonio
 Una signorina senza rivoltella
 Non si vive di solo poker
 Piccolo Hotel per sadici
 Quando una donna piace forte
 Bravi ragazzi bang bang
 Strangolare ma non troppo
 Ubbidire o morire
 Vietato essere felici
 A Porta Venezia con paura
 Come è fatto un mostro?
 La giustizia quasi arriva ad Arzavò
 Il nodo Luisa
 La vendetta è il miglior perdono
 Ricordati Cuore Infranto

Adaptations
Stories from book were the basis for the 1972 film Caliber 9, directed by Fernando Di Leo, and the 1976 film Young, Violent, Dangerous, directed by Romolo Guerrieri.

References

External links
 Italian publicity page 

1969 short story collections
Books adapted into films
Crime short story collections
Italian short story collections
Italian-language books
Milan in fiction
Works by Giorgio Scerbanenco